This is the discography of American female vocal group the Three Degrees.

Albums

Studio albums

Live albums

Compilation albums

Singles

Notes

References

Discographies of American artists
Soul music discographies
Disco discographies